Mélodie Lesueur (born 12 March 1990) is a French road racing cyclist, who currently rides for French amateur team CSM Puteaux. Lesueur won the French National Road Race Championships in 2010 and became European champion in the under-23 individual time trial at the 2011 European Road Championships.

Major results

2009
 4th Chrono des Nations
 6th Time trial, UEC European Under-23 Road Championships
 8th Overall La Route de France
2010
 1st  Road race, National Road Championships
 7th Chrono des Nations
 9th Time trial, UEC European Under-23 Road Championships
2011
 1st  Time trial, UEC European Under-23 Road Championships
 9th Chrono des Nations
 10th Cholet Pays de Loire Dames
2012
 7th Chrono des Nations
 10th Time trial, UEC European Under-23 Road Championships
2013
 3rd Time trial, National Road Championships
 8th Road race, Jeux de la Francophonie
2014
 2nd Road race, National Road Championships
 3rd Chrono des Nations
 10th Overall Tour Cycliste Féminin International de l'Ardèche

References

External links
 

1990 births
Living people
French female cyclists
Sportspeople from Beauvais
Cyclists from Hauts-de-France